Sealed Lips (Swedish: Förseglade läppar) is a 1927 Swedish silent drama film directed by Gustaf Molander and starring Mona Mårtenson, Fred Louis Lerch and Sandra Milovanoff. It was shot at the Råsunda Studios in Stockholm and on location at Lake Como and Feltre in Italy.The film's sets were designed by the art director Vilhelm Bryde. The French actress Geneviève Cargèse was originally cast in the lead role but had to drop out due to illness.

Cast
 Mona Mårtenson as 	Angela
 Fred Louis Lerch as 	Frank Wood 
 Sandra Milovanoff as Marian Wood
 Stina Berg as 	Sister Scolastica
 Edvin Adolphson as	Giambastista
 Karin Swanström as Aunt Peppina
 Josua Bengtson as 	Train Passenger
 Erik 'Bullen' Berglund as Train Conductor
 Gösta Gustafson as Train Passenger
 Wanda Rothgardt as 	Novice
 Tekla Sjöblom as Nun
 John Melin as 	Man at the inn

References

Bibliography
 Gustafsson, Tommy . Masculinity in the Golden Age of Swedish Cinema: A Cultural Analysis of 1920s Films. McFarland, 2014.

External links

1927 films
1927 drama films
Swedish drama films
Swedish silent feature films
Films directed by Gustaf Molander
Swedish black-and-white films
Films shot in Italy
Films set in Italy
Silent drama films
1920s Swedish films